Mirror Eye is the second studio album by American rock band Psychic Ills. It was released on January 20, 2009, by the Social Registry.

Critical reception

At Metacritic, which assigns a weighted rating out of 100 to reviews from mainstream critics, the album has an average score of 61 based on 8 reviews, indicating "generally favorable reviews". Jennifer Kally of Dusted stated that "[t]he balance – between groove and experiment, organic and synthetic sound – shifts constantly on this very strong album, sometimes prodding listeners to think, other times comforting them with familiar sounds and, occasionally, overwhelming them with ephemeral beauty."

Track listing

References

2009 albums
Psychic Ills albums
The Social Registry albums